Hamza Zenevisi or Amos Sarbissa ( 1456–60), was an Ottoman official who served as the sanjakbey of the Sanjak of Mezistre.

Life
Born a Christian, of the Zenevisi family from Zagoria region, in modern southern Albania, between Përmet and Argyrokastro (Gjirokastër). He was sent as a hostage to the Ottoman court after his family submitted to the sultan.

In 1459, Hamza defeated the forces of the Despots of the Morea besieging Patras in 1459. In 1460, following the Ottoman conquest of the Morea, Hamza became the sanjak-bey of the Sanjak of Mezistre.

References

15th-century people from the Ottoman Empire
15th-century Albanian people
Zenevisi family
Governors of the Ottoman Empire
Albanians from the Ottoman Empire